The 2021 Australian Formula 3 Championship is an Australian open-wheel racing series for FIA Formula 3 cars constructed and conforming to the regulations before and including 2016, having previously been before and including 2011 the previous season. The season began on 5 March 2021 at Sydney Motorsport Park and was planned to finish on 5 December 2021 at The Bend Motorsport Park. Organized by Formula Three Management Pty Ltd, it is to be the 22nd season of Australian Formula 3, with the 2020 season having been cancelled due to the COVID-19 pandemic. This is also the first season where the championship winner would earn a prize S5000 test drive. After the first round at Sydney the remaining rounds had to be cancelled due to COVID-19 travel restrictions being in place. Attention was then turned to the 2022 season.

Teams and drivers
The following teams and drivers contested the 2021 Australian Formula 3 Championship. All teams are Australian-registered.

Classes
Competing cars were nominated into one of three classes:
 Championship Class – for automobiles constructed in accordance with the FIA Formula 3 regulations that applied in the year of manufacture between 1 January 2002 and 31 December 2016. It was announced that new for this season, all cars entered would qualify for Championship Class. However, this clearly has since been reversed.
 National Class – for automobiles constructed in accordance with the FIA Formula 3 regulations that applied in the year of manufacture between 1 January 2002 and 31 December 2007.
 Invitation Category – for automobiles constructed in accordance with the FIA Formula 3 regulations that applied in the year of manufacture before 2002, as well as other open wheel ‘wings and slicks’ cars including Formula 1000, Formula Ford 2000, Formula Renault, Formula BMW, TRS, Formula 4, etc.

Calendar & race results
The series is to be contested over six rounds. All rounds will be held in Australia.

Round 2 at Morgan Park Raceway was originally to be held on 11–13 April but was postponed on 31 March due to COVID-19 restrictions. 
Again, Round 3 at Winton Motor Raceway was affected by similar regional COVID-19 restrictions, firstly being pushed back from the original date of 11–13 June to 16–18 July, then being classified as a Non-championship round due to some entrants not being able to enter Victoria, and finally being postponed on 15 July. It was then rescheduled for 20–22 August
The AMRS announced the cancellation of the subsequent round at Queensland, previously to be held between 6–8 August, due to an inability to reschedule the meeting if it were postponed.

Championship standings 

 Points system
Points for are awarded as follows:

Drivers' championship

References

External links
 Official Web Page

Australian Formula 3 seasons
Formula 3
Australian
Australia